Jon Jacobs may refer to:

Jon Jacobs (born 1966), British actor and entrepreneur
Jon Jacobs (comics), see Fan Expo Canada
Jon Jacobs (music producer), nominated for Latin Grammy Award for Best Engineered Album

See also
John Jacobs (disambiguation)
Jonathan Jacob, Big Brother Celebrity Hijack contestant